Anthony Kelvin Stewart (born 18 September 1992) is an English professional footballer who plays as a defender for  MK Dons in EFL League One on loan from Aberdeen.

Career
Stewart came through Wycombe Wanderers's youth system and was awarded his first professional contract in 2011.

He made his Football League debut against Preston North End on 14 January 2012, playing the full match. Following this he featured among the substitutes before getting his next appearance with a start away to Stevenage. He then followed this with a home debut in the 1–1 draw with Carlisle. His emergence as a first team player coincided with reported interested from fellow League One sides Charlton, Colchester and Stevenage.

Stewart joined Crewe Alexandra on loan in November 2014. In January 2015, he signed a short-term contract to the end of the season at Crewe, with Wycombe receiving a small fee.

On 26 June 2015, having been released by Crewe at the end of the 2014–15 season, Stewart rejoined Wycombe Wanderers on a two-year deal. On 13 July 2020, Stewart scored the first goal for Wycombe Wanderers as they won the EFL League One playoff final against Oxford United at Wembley Stadium.

On 22 June 2022, Stewart signed a pre-contract with Scottish Premiership club Aberdeen on a 2 year deal. On 8 July 2022, Aberdeen manager Jim Goodwin announced that Stewart would serve as the club’s captain, taking over from Joe Lewis, with teammate Ross McCrorie serving as vice captain.

Personal life
Born in England, Stewart is of Jamaican descent.

Career statistics

Club

Honours
Wycombe Wanderers
EFL League One play-offs: 2020

Individual
Wycombe Wanderers Players' Player of the Season: 2019–20

References

External links

Official Profile at the official Wycombe Wanderers site

1992 births
Living people
Footballers from Brixton
English footballers
English sportspeople of Jamaican descent
Association football defenders
Wycombe Wanderers F.C. players
Crewe Alexandra F.C. players
English Football League players
Black British sportsmen
Aberdeen F.C. players
Scottish Professional Football League players